The name Pepang has been used for ten tropical cyclones in the Philippines by PAGASA in the Western Pacific Ocean.

 Tropical Storm Hester (1963) (30W, Pepang)
 Typhoon Kate (1967) (T6719, 21W, Pepang)
 Typhoon Jean (1971) (16W, Pepang)
 Tropical Storm Helen (1975) (21W, Pepang) – hit the Philippines and Vietnam
 Typhoon Mac (1979) (27W, Pepang) – crossed southern Luzon and then made landfall near Hong Kong
 Tropical Storm Joe (1983) (Pepang)
 Typhoon Lynn (1987) (27W, Pepang) – responsible for severe flooding in Taiwan
 Tropical Storm Luke (1991) (20W, Pepang) – short-lived storm that brushed Japan
 Typhoon Zack (1995) (28W, Pepang) – a Category 4 typhoon that crossed the central Philippines and then made landfall on eastern Vietnam, causing 110 deaths
 Typhoon Dan (1999) (26W, Pepang) – a Category 3 typhoon that hit northern Luzon then eastern China

Pacific typhoon set index articles